Hubbard (formerly Hubard) is an unincorporated community in Valley Township, Washington County, Arkansas, United States. It is located near the intersection of Washington County Road 21 and Hubbard Road.

A post office called  was established in 1888, and remained in operation until 1907.

References

Unincorporated communities in Washington County, Arkansas
Unincorporated communities in Arkansas